Gimel Joseph Lewis (born October 27, 1982 in Arima) is a Trinidadian professional basketball player.

Player career 
2002/03  Maloney Pacers
2003/05  Mobile Rams
2005/06  Ciudad de La Laguna
2006/07  Alerta Cantabria
2007/08  Tenerife Rural
2008/09  Plus Pujol Lleida
2009/10  Faymasa Palencia

Honours 

Plus Pujol Lleida

LEB Catalan League Champion: 1
2008

External links
Official CB Lleida website

1982 births
Living people
Trinidad and Tobago men's basketball players
Trinidad and Tobago expatriates in Spain
Expatriate basketball people in Spain
University of Mobile alumni
CB Canarias players
Tenerife CB players
Centers (basketball)
People from Arima
Palencia Baloncesto players